Grégor "Grég" Beugnot (born October 7, 1957 in Cliron, France) is a former French professional basketball player and a current professional coach. During his playing career, he played at the point guard position.

Playing career

Club career
In his professional playing career, Beugnot played with the following clubs: Champagne Châlons Reims Basket, Asnières Basketball, Sporting Club Moderne Le Mans, Cercle Saint-Pierre de Limoges, and Paris Racing Basket.

National team career
Beugnot was a member of the senior French national basketball team. With France, he played at the 1984 Summer Olympic Games, and at the 1989 EuroBasket.

Coaching career
During his professional coaching career, Beugnot has been the head coach of some of the following clubs: Paris Racing Basket, Asvel Lyon-Villeurbanne, Pallacanestro Varese, and Élan Sportif Chalonnais.

Awards and accomplishments

Playing career
5× French League Champion: (1979, 1982, 1985, 1988, 1989)
French Federation Cup Winner: (1985)
3× French League All-Star Game (1988, 1989, 1990)
French Leaders Cup Winner: (1988)
FIBA Saporta Cup Champion: (1988)

Coaching career
5× French Federation Cup Winner: (1996, 1997, 2001, 2011, 2012)
4× French League Best Coach: (1996, 1997, 1998, 2012)
French Leaders Cup Winner: (2012)
French League Champion: (2012)

Personal life
Beugnot's father, Jean-Paul, and his brother, Éric, were also professional basketball players.

References

External links
Basketball-Reference.com Olympics Profile
FIBA Profile
Euroleague.net Coaching Profile
FIBA Europe Coaching Profile
French League Coaching Profile 

1957 births
Living people
ASVEL Basket coaches
Basketball players at the 1984 Summer Olympics
Élan Chalon coaches
French basketball coaches
French men's basketball players
Le Mans Sarthe Basket players
Levallois Metropolitans coaches
Limoges CSP players
Olympic basketball players of France
Pallacanestro Varese coaches
Paris Racing Basket coaches
Paris Racing Basket players
Sportspeople from Ardennes (department)
Point guards
Reims Champagne Basket players
SLUC Nancy Basket coaches